Charles Norris (October 21, 1963 – February 6, 2023) was an American professional wrestler, best known for his tenure in the World Championship Wrestling (WCW) in 1993. He spent the majority of his career in Minnesota-based Pro Wrestling America (PWA), where he became a five-time Heavyweight Champion and a two-time Tag Team Champion.

Early life
Norris was born on October 21, 1963, in Red Lake, Minnesota, a community located in the Red Lake Indian Reservation. He graduated at Red Lake Senior High School in 1984.

Professional wrestling career

Pro Wrestling America (1989–1993)
Norris began training with Eddie Sharkey in 1988 and signed with Sharkey's professional wrestling promotion Pro Wrestling America (PWA), where he was quickly pushed as a main eventer. He was booked to win the promotion's Heavyweight Championship for the first time by beating Ricky Rice on October 4, 1989. This was the first title of his career and he had an impressive reign as he held the title for eight months before dropping the title back to Rice on May 14, 1990. Norris regained the title from Terminator Riggs on February 7, 1991, only to lose it back to Riggs four days later. Norris' second reign was the shortest in the title's history. On May 11, Norris won his third Heavyweight Championship by beating The Golden Idol, who substituted for Riggs after the champion no-showed the event. Norris lost the title to Teijo Khan on October 14 before beating Khan for his fourth Heavyweight Championship on December 22. Norris lost the title to Punisher Sledge on February 17, 1992, and beat him to win the title for a record setting fifth time on April 26. His fifth reign lasted six months as he lost the title to The Hater on October 20. This was Norris' final reign as champion. Shortly after, he departed the company in early 1993.

Norris was considered to be brought in during early 1991 to portray a Native American character in the World Wrestling Federation, but the company instead opted for Chris Chavis.

National Wrestling Alliance (1993)
In April 1993, he teamed with Masa Saito to defeat The Hater and Nailz at NWA Grandslam, an interpromotional event between W*ING and the National Wrestling Alliance, before signing with World Championship Wrestling (WCW).

World Championship Wrestling (1993)
Norris made his televised debut in WCW as a fan favorite on the August 21, 1993 episode of Saturday Night by defeating Fury. Norris began his first rivalry on the August 28 episode of Saturday Night against Maxx Payne, who purposely lost the match via count-out. Norris defeated Payne in a lumberjack match on the September 11 Saturday Night. He received a push during his early days by racking up wins against numerous mid-card opponents. He made his pay-per-view debut at the Fall Brawl event, where he defeated Big Sky. On the October 16 episode of Saturday Night, it was announced that Norris would team with The Shockmaster and Ice Train against Harlem Heat and The Equalizer in a six-man tag team match at Halloween Havoc. In preparation for the match, Norris and his teammates defeated enhancement talents Jeff Gamble, Fred Avery and Todd Zane on the following week's Saturday Night. At the Halloween Havoc pay-per-view, Norris and his teammates were victorious against Harlem Heat and The Equalizer in the opening match. Norris' push was halted after he suffered his first loss against Steve Austin on the November 14 episode of Main Event. At the Battlebowl pay-per-view on November 20, Norris teamed with Kane of Harlem Heat against Cactus Jack and Vader in the first round of Lethal Lottery, in which Norris was pinned by Vader. He left WCW following the event. His last match was on the January 29, 1994 episode of WorldWide, in which he unsuccessfully challenged Lord Steven Regal for the World Television Championship.

Return to PWA (1994–1996)
After leaving WCW, Norris returned to his home promotion PWA and became a tag team competitor. On August 15, 1994, Norris won his first Tag Team Championship with Sam Houston by defeating The Storm Troopers. The following year, Norris and Houston lost the title back to Storm Troopers. Norris then formed a tag team with Derrick Dukes in 1996, known as "Thunderblood" and defeated Storm Troopers to win the title for a second time. The duo were recognized as the final champions as the title was retired later that year.

Independent circuit (1996–2006)
Norris briefly joined American Wrestling Federation (AWF) during 1996 teaming with Tito Santana in his feud against Bob Orton, Sr. and The Blacktop Bully. He appeared in the several independent circuit cards for the next decade.

Later life and death
After his retirement in 2006, Norris resided on the Red Lake Indian Reservation, and worked as a personal trainer at the gym in Red Lake.

Norris died on 6 February 2023, at the age of 59.

Championships and accomplishments
Northern Premier Wrestling
NPW Heavyweight Championship (1 time)
Pro Wrestling America
PWA Heavyweight Championship (5 times)
PWA Tag Team Championship (2 times) – with Sam Houston (1) and  Derrek Dukes (1)
Pro Wrestling Illustrated
PWI ranked him #90 of the top 500 singles wrestlers in the PWI 500 in 1993
PWI ranked him # 475 of the 500 best singles wrestlers of the PWI Years in 2003
Wrestle America 2000
WA2K Tag Team Championship (1 time)

References

External links 
 
 

1963 births
2023 deaths
American male professional wrestlers
Native American professional wrestlers
People from Red Lake, Minnesota
Professional wrestlers from Minnesota
20th-century professional wrestlers
21st-century professional wrestlers